Mikhlaf Asfal is a sub-district located in the At-Ta'iziyah District, Taiz Governorate, Yemen. Mikhlaf Asfal had a population of 16,510 according to the 2004 census.

References  

Sub-districts in At-Ta'iziyah District